In various sports, a countback is used to break ties.

Field events

High jump and pole vault 
World Athletics, the international governing body for athletics, uses the following criteria to break ties (rule 26.8 in the 2020 edition of the World Athletics competition and technical rules):

1. Fewest misses at the tie height cleared

2. Fewest misses throughout the competition (passes are not counted)

3. If the competitors are not tied for first place, a tie is declared. For first place, a jump-off may be run. However, the competitors have the option to not jump any more, either before or during the jump-off, in which case they would remain tied. This occurred in the men's high jump at the 2020 Summer Olympics. Mutaz Essa Barshim and Gianmarco Tamberi both cleared 2.37 m without a single miss in the event and both failed to clear 2.39. Rather than go to a jump-off, Barshim asked, "Can we have two golds?" Both were declared Olympic champions.

Other field events 
Per rule 25.22 of the 2020 edition of the World Athletics competition and technical rules, the second-best result is used to determine placements. If the competitors are still tied, then the third-best is checked, and so on. If the tie is still not broken after all results are compared, a tie is declared.

In the men's long jump at the 2020 Summer Olympics, Miltiadis Tentoglou and Juan Miguel Echevarría both reached 8.41 m, but Tentoglou was awarded the gold medal because his second-best result was 8.15, to Echevarría's 8.09.

Boxing

Golf

Olympic shooting events

References 

Sports rules and regulations